Woodfield may refer to:

Places
 Woodfield, South Carolina
 Woodfield Mall, Schaumburg, Illinois
 Woodfield, Victoria, Australia

People with the surname
 Charmian Woodfield (1929-2014), British archaeologist 
 Clarrie Woodfield (1901-1968), Australian rules footballer
 David Woodfield (born 1943), English footballer
 Ern Woodfield (1888-1974), Australian rules footballer
 Les Woodfield (1899-1974), Australian rules footballer
 Philip Woodfield (1923-2000), British civil servant
 Randall Woodfield (born 1950), American convicted murder and possible serial killer
 William Woodfield (1928-2001), American photographer and screenwriter